Nestor Pirotte (January 5, 1933 – July 29, 2000), known as The Crazy Killer (French: Le tueur fou), was a Belgian serial killer, considered one of the worst Belgian criminals of the 20th century before Marc Dutroux. He was sentenced for murdering three people, in addition to being suspected of four other murders.

Youth 
The son of a chatelain's gamekeeper in the Château de Beau Chêne estate in the Moligneé valley and a seamstress, Nestor and his brother Anthony played with the children of aristocrats since they were little. Often boasting about being the child of a lord, he not only vocabularily but also physically engaged in high-society activities, which would later drive him to commit his crimes.

It was during his military service that he began to conquer with his talk on his aristocratic origins. He invented himself a world, stating that he had begun stealing from his comrades at a very young age and looted coffers around the city. He was condemned for the first time at the age of 20, and was sentenced to a 3-month suspended sentence.

Crimes 
Pirotte's bloody journey began on April 20, 1954, when he learned that one of his great-aunts, Celina Debonny, had just sold some cattle. He proceeded to smash her skull with an iron bar near Durbuy, but the coveted money had already been spent. He was condemned according to military justice law for this crime, and on June 11, 1955 he was sentenced to death, but his sentence was commuted to life imprisonment.

Pretending to be a madman so he could be interned, Pirotte was sent to a specialized psychiatric facility. On March 23, 1968, after 13 years of incarceration, he was released on parole, shortly resuming his murders afterwards. On May 14, just a few weeks after his release, Pirotte went to a financial institution, where he pretended to be the Count of Ribaucourt. Under the pretext of wanting to negotiate a major deal discreetly, he asked to consult with the manager of the bank in Genval, Mr. Delisse, whom he shot in the head.

Quickly identified, Pirotte was arrested on May 21 of the same year and was sent to prison, where he feigned a suicide attempt by throwing himself a wall six meters high. This suicide attempt was only the first attempt of escape by Pirotte. He was transferred to the Establishment of Social Defense Tournai in 1970 and, after 10 years, was considered suitable to be reintegrated into society, was released and found a job in a broadcasting store on Spintay Street in Verviers.

Pirotte became a suspect in 1980, when the gendarmes discovered the lifeless bodies of Madeleine Humbert, her two employees and the dog in the restaurant "La Vieille France" in Spa on December 11. A manager in home appliances, Pirotte was a supplier of Humbert and a regular on the premises. The police found the name of the last customer on the slate of the restaurant: "Nestor". Pirotte was immediately suspected, since the owner's son had also disappeared.

Although the lifeless body of the young man was found in January 1981, the killing remained a mystery to the police. However, Pirotte was soon arrested in Brussels for failing to comply with all the conditions of his parole. Once again imprisoned, he escaped on the night between August 2 to 3, and panic settled in Belgium when the news was broadcast to the public.

Faithful to his habits, Pirotte killed again on September 18 while pretending to be the Count of Meeûs d'Argenteuil, who sought to sell the furniture of his castle. His victim being a Brussels antique dealer. Only after a while did Commissioner Frédéric Godfroid of the Brussels Police arrest Pirotte, who was sentenced to death in 1984, albeit this was once more commuted to life in prison. Faithful to his habits once again, Pirotte tried to escape in 1992, but failed. After nearly 40 years behind bars, Nestor Pirotte was feared by other prisoners and remained until his death the most formidable "Public Enemy Number 1 in Belgium".

Death 
Nestor Pirotte died from a heart attack on July 29, 2000. Having received no visits from his family since 1980, it was unsurprising that only one woman he had known from his youth attended the funeral.

He was buried in the Ham-sur-Heure cemetery in an unmarked grave. Ashamed, all members of his family left the country. Although dead, he is often regarded as the first Belgian serial killer, to date only surpassed by pedophile Marc Dutroux in terms of instilling fear on the population.

References

Radio broadcast 
"Nestor Pirotte, the public enemy Number 1 of Belgium", broadcast on January 15, 2014 on Heure du Crime, hosted by Jacques Pradel on RTL.

See also 
 Marc Dutroux
 List of serial killers by country

1933 births
2000 deaths
Belgian people convicted of murder
Belgian serial killers
Male serial killers
Serial killers who died in prison custody